Multifunctional Information Distribution System (MIDS) is the NATO name for the communication component of Link-16.

MID is an advanced command, control, communications, computing and intelligence (C4I) system incorporating high-capacity, jam-resistant, digital communication links for exchange of near real-time tactical information, including both data and voice, among air, ground, and sea elements. MIDS is intended to support key theater functions such as surveillance, identification, air control, weapons engagement coordination and direction for all Services.

The MIDS program includes two different families of receiver synthesizer line cards: 
 MIDS-LVT (Low volume terminal): LVT(1), LVT(2), or LVT(3).
 MIDS-JTRS (Joint Tactical Radio System Terminals).  MIDS-JTRS is a Software Defined Radio (SDR) that is compliant with the JTRS Software Communication Architecture (SCA).  MIDS JTRS maintains the Link-16, J-Voice, and TACAN functionality of the older MIDS-LVT standard, and adds link-16 enhanced throughput (ET), link-16 frequency remapping (FR), and programmable crypto.

The MIDS terminal is based on the TDMA (Time Division Multiple Access) data-link technology with 128 time slots per second; during each time slot, only one terminal is allowed to transmit while all the other terminals on the same network are set to receive. To improve the anti-jamming capability signals are spread over 51 frequencies in the 960-1215 MHz frequency band; transmission is inhibited around the two IFF band (1030 and 1090 MHz.)

The maximum output power of a MIDS terminal is 200 Watts which allows an operational range of 300 miles; range can be extended by relaying information between intermediate terminals.

MIDS Components

The MIDS terminal consists of two different Line Replacement Units (LRUs): the Main Terminal and the Remote Power supply (RPS). The Main Terminal consists of 10 Shop Replaceable Units (SRUs):
 Chassis
 Power Amplifier (PA)
 Exciter/IPF (Interference Protection Feature)
 Receiver Synthesizer (R/S, 2 per terminal), Either LVT(1), LVT(2), LVT(3), or JTRS Terminals
 Signal Message Processor (SMP)
 Tactical Air Navigation (TACAN)
 Voice
 Tailored Processor (TP)/Avionic MUX (1553B/3910)
 Data Processor (DP)/Ground MUX (X.25/Ethernet)
 Receiver-Transmitter Interface (RTI/Discrete)

In addition there are a few accessories required by some specific platforms:
 High Power Amplifier Interface Assembly (HIA)
 Direct Current Adapter (DCA)
 Alternate Current Adapter (ACA)

The MIDS terminal is equipped with four different interfaces to communicate with the host platform:
 MIL-STD-1553B
 STANAG 3910
 Ethernet
 X.25

Data rate can vary between 108 and 238 kbit/s, depending on the interface used. Secure voice messages are available with two different rates: 16 kbit/s and 2.4 kbit/s. The MIDS SW consists of two main configuration items:
 Core SW (basically a modified JTIDS SW), which handles the LINK-16 messages;
 Tailored Input/Output (I/O) SW, which handles communications with the host platform.

MIDS Terminals exchange communication data with an onboard computer platform known as the Host which will format, filter, and/or condition communication data for presentation.

MIDS Receiver Synthesizer line cards variants

MIDS-JTRS
MIDS-JTRS is a Software Defined Radio  that is compliant with the JTRS Software Communication Architecture (SCA). MIDS-JTRS is a replacement for the MIDS-LVT and adds three additional channels for JTRS wavesforms. As the MIDS-LVT migrates to the JTRS compliance, the system will maintain its link 16 and TACAN functionality with Navy and
Air Force platforms that use MIDS-LVT but also accommodates future technologies and capabilities as part of MIDS-JTRS. MIDS JTRS improvements include enhanced link 16 throughput, link 16 frequency remappings and programmable crypto.  MIDS-JTRS will provide an additional three 2-megahertz or 2 gigahertz programmable channels to accommodate incremental delivery of advanced JTRS waveforms.

MIDS-LVT
The MIDS family includes 3 main variants. 
 LVT(1), which was developed for integration on a multitude of surface and airborne platforms, and is characterized by PhEN 3910, MIL-STD-1553B, Ethernet, and X.25 physical interfaces, and the adoption of both Voice and TACAN functions. 
 LVT(2) was developed by the US, specifically to satisfy the requirements set by the US Army. This terminal is characterized by unique power supply and blower systems, and by the Army Data Distribution System Interface (ADDSI) X.25 interface. 
 FDLT or LVT(3) (Fighter Data Link Terminal) specifically developed to meet the requirements of  F-15 fighter platforms.

Additional variants:
 MoS (MIDS On Ship) designed for rack mounting (in place of JTIDS), with specific power supply and high power amplifier units.

Overall 11 different variants of the MIDS-LVT are known.

One commonly used instance of an MIDS is the MIDS Low Volume Terminal (MIDS-LVT) which has been funded by the United States, France, Germany, Italy, and Spain and developed by MIDSCO, a joint venture by Thomson CSF, GEC, Siemens, Italtel, and Enosa. Another such terminal is the MIDS-JTRS (MIDS Joint Tactical Radio System), which is currently under development by the United States. An older MIDS is the JTIDS (Joint Tactical Information Distribution System).  Currently, there are three production lines, which are competitors: ViaSat, Inc (USA), Data Link Solutions LLC (USA), and EuroMIDS (Europe).

See also
Joint Tactical Info Distribution System (JTIDS)
Joint Tactical Radio System (JTRS)
Tactical Data Link
Link 16
Link 11
Link 4

References 
Multifunctional Information Distribution System (MIDS) Low Volume Terminal (LVT) Development and Integration Programs Towards LINK-16 Network Centric Allied/Coalition Operations (UNCLASSIFIED/UNLIMITED), Roberto Sabatini (MAJ Italian Air Force) et al.

External links 
 GlobalSecurity's Military Aircraft Systems - MIDS Description

Military radio systems